Witta is a rural town and locality in the Sunshine Coast Region, Queensland, Australia.

History 

Witta was first settled around 1887 by German immigrant families. They called it Teutoberg (also spelled Teutoburg), possibly referring to the Teutoburg Forest area in Germany. The town was renamed in 1916 during World War 1 due to anti-German sentiment. The name Witta is a corruption of the  word wetya meaning dingo in the Kabi language.

Maleny Provisional School opened on 1 October 1892 with the first enrolments on 3 October 1892. It was renamed Teutoberg Provisional School in 1893. It became Teutoberg State School in 1909, and Witta State School in 1926. The school closed on 23 August 1974.

A reserve for a School of Arts (often known as Mechanics' institutes outside Queensland) was gazetted in 1907. The School of Arts was opened on 7 October 1908 by Harry Frederick Walker, Member of the Queensland Legislative Assembly for Wide Bay.

In the 2011 census, Witta had a population of 1,230 people.

Geography
Witta is located within the Blackall Ranges. The lower land is mostly cleared for residential and farming purposes. The higher land is largely undeveloped natural bushland.

Amenities

There is a small cemetery on Witta Road.

Attractions 
Obi Lookout is on Schultz Road.

Notable residents 
 Otto Nothling, born in Witta, represented Australia in cricket and rugby union

See also 
 Mechanics' institutes of Australia
 Blackall Range road network

References

Further reading 

  — includes Witta State School

External links 

 
 

Suburbs of the Sunshine Coast Region
Towns in Queensland
Localities in Queensland